Kundan Vidya Mandir, also known as Kundan Vidya Mandir Senior Secondary School (abbreviated to KVM) is a co-educational senior secondary school with 2 campuses in Ludhiana. It was founded in 1941 by freedom fighter, Rai Sahib Kundan Lal. The school is affiliated with the Central Board of Secondary Education (CBSE). It offers education from kindergarten to class XII.

The current principal of the school is Anand Prakash Sharma. It is run by Shri Kundan Lal Trust, which also has a school in Chandigarh by name of Kundan International School.

History 

Founded in 1941, the school is named after its founder, Rai Sahib Kundan Lal, who was a freedom fighter and philanthropist.

It got affiliated to the Central Board of Secondary Education in 1963, becoming the first CBSE school in Punjab, India.  

The school has another branch in Chandigarh, called Kundan International School, which was established in 2007. The Chandigarh campus is headed by the headmistress, Manjeet Jauhar.

The school is administered and managed by the Shri Kundan Lal Trust, a charitable trust.

Campus 
The school's infrastructure facilities include a library, labs for physics, chemistry, biology, geography, psychology, a conference hall, music rooms, and dance rooms. It hosts 112 classrooms, an activity room, art room, computer labs, robotics lab, 3D lab, home science lab, math lab, language lab, canteen, state of the art auditorium and infirmary.

The sports facilities of Kundan Vidya Mandir include two splash pools, volleyball court, football ground, skating rink and shooting range. It also has a playground that measures 3937 square metres. The school campus of KVM is spread across 7 acres.

Notable alumni 
 Pankaj Kapur (Actor)
 Harjot Kaur (Civil servant & Strategic Adviser to the World Bank)
 Karan Goel (cricketer)
 Gitansh Khera (cricketer)

Recognition 
 Kundan Vidya Mandir was listed among the top ten schools in Ludhiana by The Hush Post in 2018.
The school has been ranked #218 in the survey of EW Ranking in 2017.
 It ranked #5 in a list of Punjab's Top School Ranking 2014 by the Elets 's Digital Learning (DL) Ranking.
 Kundan Vidya Mandir was awarded Rex Karmaveer Education Change Champion Fellowship and Karmaveer Chakra Award in 2019.

See also 

 Education in Punjab, India
 List of schools in India

References

External links 
 Official website of Kundan Vidya Mandir
 Official website of Kundan International School

Education in Ludhiana
Schools in Ludhiana
Schools in Punjab, India
1941 establishments in India
Educational institutions established in 1941